The following is an incomplete list of works by the Polish composer Krzysztof Penderecki.

Operas
The Most Valiant Knight, children's opera in 3 acts (1965)
Die Teufel von Loudun (The Devils of Loudun, 1968–69), based on the nonfiction book of the same name by Aldous Huxley.
Paradise Lost (1975–78), based on the epic poem by John Milton
Die schwarze Maske (The Black Mask) (1984–86), based on the play by Gerhart Hauptmann
Ubu Rex (1990–91), based on the play Ubu Roi by Alfred Jarry

Symphonies
Symphony No. 1 (1973)
Symphony No. 2: Christmas (1980)
Symphony No. 3 (1988–95)
Symphony No. 4: Adagio (1989), winner of the 1992 Grawemeyer Award for Music Composition
Symphony No. 5: Korean (1991–92)
Symphony No. 6: Chinese Poems (2008–17)
Symphony No. 7: Seven Gates of Jerusalem (1996), for soloists, speaker, triple chorus and orchestra
Symphony No. 8: Lieder der Vergänglichkeit (2004–05, rev. 2008), for voices, chorus and orchestra

Orchestral
 Symphonic Scherzo for orchestra (c. 1953–55, withdrawn)
 Overture for orchestra (1956–57, withdrawn)
 Epitaph Artur Malawski in Memoriam for string orchestra and timpani (1958)
Emanations (Emanacje, 1959) for two string orchestras tuned a semitone apart
Anaklasis (1959) for strings and percussion
Threnody to the Victims of Hiroshima (Tren Ofiarom Hiroszimy, 1961) for 52 string instruments
Polymorphia (1961) for 48 string instruments
Fluorescences (Fluorescencje, 1961–62) for orchestra
Canon (1962) for string orchestra
Three Pieces in Baroque Style (1963, music for The Saragossa Manuscript)
De Natura Sonoris No. 1 (1966)
Pittsburgh Overture (1967) for wind band
Kosmogonia (1970)
De Natura Sonoris No. 2 (1971)
Prélude (1971) for winds, percussion and double basses
Actions (1971) for free jazz orchestra
Intermezzo (1973) for 24 strings
The Dream of Jacob ("Als Jakob erwachte...") (1974)
Adagietto from Paradise Lost (1979)
Sinfonietta No. 1, for string orchestra (1992, arranged from String Trio)
Sinfonietta No. 2, for clarinet and strings (1994, arranged from Clarinet Quartet)
Music from Ubu Rex (1994)
Entrata (1994), for brass and timpani
Burlesque Suite from Ubu Rex (1995) for large wind band
Serenade, for string orchestra (1996–97)
Luzerner Fanfare (1998), for eight trumpets and percussion
Fanfarria Real (2003)
Danziger Fanfare (2008), for brass and percussion
Prelude for Peace (2009), for brass and percussion
De Natura Sonoris No. 3 (2012)
Sinfonietta No. 3, for string orchestra (2012, arranged from String Quartet No. 3)
Adagio for string orchestra (2013; from Symphony No. 3)
Polonaise for orchestra (2016)
Polonaise No. 2 for orchestra (2018)
Fanfare for the independent Poland for 7 brass instruments, timpani and percussion (2018)

Concertante
Piano:
Piano Concerto: Resurrection (2001–02, revised 2007)
Violin:
Violin Concerto (1962–63; withdrawn)
Capriccio for Violin and Orchestra (1967)
Violin Concerto No. 1 (1976–77, revised 1987), for Isaac Stern
Violin Concerto No. 2: Metamorphosen (1992–95), for Anne-Sophie Mutter
Viola:
Viola Concerto (1983, also versions for: clarinet, cello, and version for chamber orchestra)
Cello:
Sonata for Cello and Orchestra (1964), for Siegfried Palm
Cello Concerto No. 1 (1972)
Cello Concerto No. 2 (1982)
Cello Concerto (transcription from Viola Concerto, 1983)
Concerto Grosso No. 1, for three cellos and orchestra (2000–01)
Largo for cello and orchestra (2003)
Flute:
Fonogrammi for flute and chamber orchestra (1961)
Concerto for flute and chamber orchestra (1992)
Sinfonietta for flute and string orchestra (2019)
Oboe:
Capriccio for Oboe and Eleven Strings (1964)
Clarinet:
Concerto for clarinet and chamber orchestra (1995, transcription from Flute Concerto, 1992)
Clarinet Concerto (1997, transcription from Viola Concerto, 1983)
Concerto Grosso No. 2, for five clarinets and orchestra (2004)
Horn
Horn Concerto (2008)
Others:
Concerto for violino grande and orchestra (1967; withdrawn)
Partita, for harpsichord, electric guitar, bass guitar, harp, double bass and orchestra (1971, revised 1991)
Music for alto flute, marimba and strings (2000; from Symphony No. 3)
Double Concerto for violin, viola and orchestra (2012)
Trumpet Concertino (2015)
Saxophone Concerto (2015; after Viola Concerto)

Vocal/choral
 Asking for Happy Isles for voice and piano (c. 1954–55)
 The Sky at Night for voice and piano (1955)
 Silence for voice and piano (1955)	
 Psalms of David (1958)
 Breath of Night for voice and piano (1958)
 Strophen (1959) for soprano, speaker and ten instruments
 Dimensions of Time and Silence (1959–61)
 African Lyrics for voice and piano (1960)
 Stabat Mater (1962)
 Cantata (1964)
 St Luke Passion (1965)
 Dies Irae (1967)
 Kosmogonia (1970) 
 Utrenja (Morning Prayer) (1969–71)
 Ecloga VIII (1972)
 Canticum Canticorum Salomonis (1970–73)
 Magnificat (1973–74)
 Te Deum (1979)
 Agnus Dei (1981)
 Polish Requiem (1980–84, revised and expanded 1993, expanded 2005 after Pope John Paul II's death)
 Song of the Cherubim (1986)
 Veni creator (1987)
 Benedicamus Domino (1992)
 Benedictus (1993)
 Agnus Dei (1995, for the Requiem of Reconciliation)
 De Profundis (1996)
 Hymne an den heiligen Daniel (1997)
 Hymne an den heiligen Adalbert (1997)
 Credo (1997–98)
 Benedictus (2002)
 Santus for chorus a capella (2008)
 Gloriosa virginum for chorus a capella (2009)
 Kaddish (2009), for voices, choir, and orchestra
 Ein feste Burg ist unser Gott (2010), for mixed choir, brass, percussion and string orchestra
 Powiało na mnie morze snów...  (A sea of dreams did breathe on me... Songs of reverie and nostalgia, 2010)
 Missa brevis for chorus a capella (2013)
 Dies illa (2014), for three soloists, three mixed choirs and orchestra
 Budapest '56 "Requiem" for narrator, soloists, chorus and orchestra (2015–16)
 Domine quid multiplicati sunt for chorus a capella (2015)
 Lacrimosa No. 2 for soprano, chorus and chamber orchestra (2018)

Chamber
Violin Sonata No. 1 (1953)
Misterioso for flute and piano (1954 or 1955)
Three Miniatures for Clarinet and Piano (1956)
String Quartet (1956–57; withdrawn)
Three Miniatures for Violin and Piano (1959)
String Quartet No. 1 (1960)
String Quartet No. 2 (1968)
Der unterbrochene Gedanke, for string quartet (1988)
String Trio (1991)
Clarinet Quartet (1993)
Violin Sonata No. 2 (1999)
Sextet, for clarinet, horn, violin, viola, cello and piano (2000)
Agnus Dei, for eight cellos (transcription of the choral work; 2007)
String Quartet No. 3 (2008)
Serenata, for three cellos (2008)
Duo concertante, for violin and double bass (2010)
String Quintet (2015)
String Quartet No. 4 (2016)

Solo instrument
Violin
Capriccio (2008)
Tanz (2009)
La Follia (2013)
Viola
Cadenza (1984)
Sarabande (2000–01)
Tanz (2010)
Tempo di valse (2013)
Cello
Capriccio per Siegfried Palm (1968)
Per Slava (1986)
Suite (initially entitled Divertimento) (1994-2013)
Violoncello totale (2011)
Clarinet
Prelude (1987)
Horn
Capriccio per Radovan "Il sogno di un cacciatore" (2012)
Tuba
Capriccio (1980)
Keyboard
Mensura sortis for 2 pianos (1963; withdrawn)
De rebus sonoribus for harpsichord (1965; withdrawn)
Aria, Ciaccona & Vivace (2019; first composition for solo piano)

References

Penderecki